Thierno Abdourahmane Bah (1916 – 22 September 2013) was Guinean writer, poet, Muslim theologian and Fula political personality  of Fouta Djallon. He is regarded as one of the most important representatives of Islamic science and Fula culture of Fouta Djallon.

Biography

Early life: 1916–1927
Thierno Abdourahmane Bah was born in 1916 in Donghol Thiernoya, Labe, Guinea. He is the penultimate of the nine sons of Thierno Aliou Boûbha Ndiyan.  Thierno Abdourahmane was the third of four children from Nênan Maryama Fadi Diallo, who died in 1978 at age of 102 years. In the clan, boys baptized   like him are called Thierno, by respect for the ancestor Thierno Abdourahmane Nduyeejo, son of Thierno Malal Jafounanke, the first imam of Labé. Charge that he had been entrusted by Karamoko Alpha Mo Labé, and since then has been carried almost continuously by his descendants.

Childhood

Thierno Abdourahmane spent his early life while his father Thierno Aliou Bhoubha Ndiyan was recognized and accepted as one of the leaders of the public spirit in the Fouta-Djallon, a member of the aristocracy of the book in the 18th and 19th century. Paul Marty, who has carefully attended and "studied" Thierno Aliou in 1915, does not hide the actual admiration that he has felt the attendance of the scholar. He considers him as "an Arabic scholar of first value, remarkably well educated in Arabic and Islamic sciences," who "applies to all by his science, his piety and his prestige... ", etc… Paul Marty highlighted that "several hundred of Karamokos have spent their young age in his school". He cites a number, noting that "these are in general the more educated", he wrote:

Thierno Aliou appears to have focused on lifting some of the teaching methods of Foula routine and to give his students some Arabic rudiments,

Thierno Aliou Bhoubha Ndiyan was not only the great scholar of fundamental books, the innovative educator, he was also a classic poet in Arabic and in Poular, noted by Paul Marty in Islam in Guinea 1917.
According to Ibrahima Caba Bah, his children told stories that some evenings, after the extinction of the fires of the school reading, he used to bring together some of the students, often under the direction of Thierno Oumar Kaana, to make them recite his poems from one of his books (Maqaliida-As-Sa'aadati). He listened from his room standing under the orange tree in the courtyard, vaguely illuminated by the dying embers of the doudhal.

The teens, aware of the attention that their portrait recital their revered master, would go thereby heart, putting the best of their talent. Without thinking, they took a taste of the poetry, assimilated the prosody Arabic and, by corollary. The fact is that many of these students have left good quality if not charming poems, mainly in Pular, the more productive has been Thierno Jawo Pellel.

It is therefore in a family community where the study of books and the exercises of the mind were the main activity that Thierno Abdourahmane began to discover the world. When dozens of children and adolescents, sitting in a circle in the open air, around the great fire for the study of the evening, syllables or Koranic verses written on their boards, the show " Sound and Light " exudes a poetry that cannot forget anyone who lived or simply observed. Do not look elsewhere for the source to which Thierno Abdourahmane draws a taste for the written word, and poetry in particular.

Thierno Abdourahmane, despite his young age, was one of those, with his brother Thierno Habibou, who had memorized the Koran under the direction of their father, he had completed Bur-hanu and Sulaymi, two booklets, Islamic. The two brothers had also completed the book of Shaykh Abu Zayd, the famous imam of Kairouan in Tunisia, the Ricalat, this epistle quite voluminous and detailed manual of law and Islamic ritual, taught in all Koranic schools of the Fouta-Djallon. With their nephew Dai, son of Alfa Bakar Diari, the two brothers were in the revision of the Muhayyibi, a poem to the glory of the Prophet Muhammad.
Thierno Aliou Bhoubha Ndiyan had perceived the keen intelligence of his child, that he encouraged methodically, despite the fact that he has lived eleven years in the direct shadow of Thierno Aliou.
The death of Thierno Aliou certainly does not fail to leave his son helpless. But providence was watching over him , thanks perhaps to the blessing of Thierno Aliou , who wrote in Maqaliida -As- Saaadati:

I will praise The Prophet all my life. After my death, inherits from me, praising the Prophet, one that equals me.

The Son will piously highlight this quote in his book,  Wasiyyat-tu Al-Walidi. There were at the doudhal, after the death of Thierno Aliou in the month of March 1927, students more advanced, who were repeaters and assistants of education. Thierno Mamadou Sow, son of Thierno Oumarou Perejo, Thierno Abdoullahi Rumirgo, son of Salli Ouri, Thierno Oumarou Kana of Taranbali, the man of confidence, the "preferred disciple " of Thierno Aliou, Thierno Jawo Pellel, the poet, who later wrote about his colleague and elder:

There is also Thierno Oumarou Taran, who was a pupil of my master; he controlled me and helped me recover without error. The master had liked him and approached him... Indeed many of his secrets, he did not conceal him. He would put him to the rank of his children, for this which is visible the love which remains hidden is a mystery that I do not perceive.

There were at the end, at Thierno Aliou Doudhal in the month of March 1927, more advanced students that acted as tutors and teaching assistants. Thierno Mamadou sow, son of Thierno Oumar Perejo, and Thierno Abdoullahi Roumirgo, son of Salli Ouri. There were also Thierno Oumar Kaana of Taranbaali, the favorite disciple of Thierno Aliou. There were also Thierno Jawo Pellel, the poet, who later wrote about his colleague and elder:

There were also Thierno Oumarou Taran, who was a student of my master; he controlled me and straightened me without error. The master had loved him and approached him. Indeed many of his secrets, he did not conceal him ... He put him among his children, for what is visible love that remains hidden is a mystery I do not perceive

Education: 1927–1935
After the death of his father in 1927, Thierno Abdourahmane Bah, age eleven had learned to read and write the Koran, the first cycle of the traditional teaching Fouta-Djallon. He enrolled at Thierno Oumar Pereedjo Dara – Labe, where he studied from 1927 to 1935. Thierno Oumar was a disciple trained in the school of Thierno Aliou Bhoubha Ndiyan , of whom he was the nephew. Thierno Abdourahmane Bah learned from his cousin: Grammar (nahaw), Law (fiqh), theology (Tawhid), as well as other specialties (Fannu, bayan, Tasrif, Maani). The Tafsir (Annotated translation of the Koran) marked the normal term of the studies, and gave him, in accordance with tradition, the title of Thierno. In his first years of study, Thierno Bah Abdourahmane manifests real poetic gifts he expressed in pieces of circumstance in Arabic and Pular. He continued always this literary activity in the two languages.

Writings
Thierno Abdourahmane has produced a significant number of writings, in Arabic and in Pular (caakal and gimi). The Arabic texts in prose of a religious character are the sermons that he had before the Friday prayers at the Mosque of Alpha Karamoko Mo Labé. A second category of Arab prose consists of scholastic studies on questions put to the Muslim community by modern life to the conferences of Islamic law academy of which he was a member and vice president. The themes developed are: the sects in Islam, the price of blood , the fulfillment of contracts , human rights , and surrogate mothers , family planning , Aids, etc...

Poetic Arabic
The poetic Arabic Production began when Thierno Abdourahmane , thirteen years of age was studying at Thierno Oumarou Pereejo Dara-Labe. A number of pieces were collected under the title Banaatu Afkaarii, The Fruits of My Thoughts, in a volume handwritten by Al-Hajj Hanafiyyou Kompayya.
The manuscript was printed in Kuwait, on the recommendation of the Minister of Foreign Affairs of that country's Emir. The collection contains the thank the student Thierno Abdourahmane addressed to his master at the end of his studies, and the response Thierno Oumarou Pereejo, praise from Arab dignitaries that the author had the opportunity to meet: Gamal Abdel Nasser of Egypt, The King Fahd of Saudi Arabia, The Emir of Kuwait, etc…
Two other works: Maqalida -As- Saadati, keys to happiness, and Jilada Mada.Fii Hizbi Al – Qahhar, these two works develop  poems of a classical practice in Arabic literature. Both original works form couplets that he has developed into stanzas of five verses, content both original, retaining the rhyme and the general meaning of the first text. The style is called Takhmisu , which is a five door. Maqalida -As- Saadati was printed in Algeria, under this title, with the subtitle: Miftahu-Al-Masarrati, The Keys of Happiness, Waciyyatu-Al- Walidi, handwritten by Al Hajj Hanafiyyou, was printed in Conakry.

The Poetic Foutanke
The literary production in Pular has been for the most part published originally in the form of loose leaves in manuscript. The author himself was not concerned of the conservation of his works until later in his lifetime that resulted to the loss of many manuscripts without doubt. A Talibe student of Maaci in Pita, Guinea sent him one day a copy of a manuscript about Amicale Gilbert Viellard (Agv) that Thierno Abdourahmane did not have in his procession.
Apha I. Sow has published, in “the Woman, The Cow and the Faith” (1966) three Poems: Fuuta hettii bhuttu, Kaaweedji Djamaanu Meen, and Faatunde Siriifu Sagale. Boubacar B. Diallo has also published an anthology, Gimi Pular, containing two of the texts cited by Alpha Ibrahima Sow and the poem on the Independence of Guinea, Lagine Rindhii (1974). A first collection prepared by the author himself has been printed in Guinea; Conakry entitled Gimi Pular (1987). There is a list of Almamis and major scholars of the Fouta Djallon, the anthem in Fouta (Futa hettii bhuttu), a series of didactic poems about the country, the independence of Guinea, the wonders of our time, and the tribute to Cherif Sagale, the hymn to the Prophet savior.
Thierno Abdourahmane has tried to broaden the field of action of poets to other topics, for example: the material progress or the feeling of nature. It is not however clear of conventional trends, the religion and morals. However, he did not disengage of the classic trends, religion and morality themes. Thierno Abdourahmane resolves the lexical aspect of the development of African languages in the most natural way by adopting the designations with which objects or actions have been brought. This practice is also in Ogirde Malal of Thierno Mamadou Samba Mombeya. After this literary aspect of progress, the poet passes without transition to a different object, the strong condemnation of the abuse of power by the former canton chiefs. This part is a satirical breath, where emerges the compassion for the weak people, the anger against the injustice and tyranny.

Agv and the war effort
Life goes quiet and simple to Thierno Abdourahmane between his brothers, wives and comrades, with his customary automation that we practice without much thought. It will be suddenly interrupted abruptly when Hitler started World War II.

Hitler declared that war of his,
while people strutting in ease,
until then, going about their business, 
abandon that and put themselves in state of combat.

Thierno Abdourahmane, well-armed intellectually, began to observe the increasing difficulties besetting the populations, his fellow citizens. He lived intensely common suffering, poet who recognizes himself as the mirror of his people, as he later wrote:

It is the poet who enthusiasm the people, who doubles their efforts;
it is also the poet who shakes the hearts that revivify.

After the war, the intellectual Fulani of the Fouta Djallon created a cultural association, the Amicale Gilbert Viellard ( agv ) for the Renaissance and the development of the Healthy foulanite.
Thierno Abdourahmane enthusiasm for the Agv; he composed one of his first political poems to encourage the Fula to support the association.

As for Foulbhe , their cause was lost since mount years;
none of us debating what he was doing.
We were driven like cattle to pasture,
employees to all sorts of “taches”,
rising, falling , without knowing why or how. 

An epistle to democracy, accurately describing its aims and methods, an instrument of unity for the Fulani nation whose leaders should be honest and patriotic:

O president, be an honest, loving his
country and his men , that alone leads to the goal;
O members, be united behind this
leader, watch what he does.

The text is warmly welcomed by the leaders of Gilbert Viellard (AGV), including Mr. Yacine Diallo.
The poem was multiplied and distributed widely throughout the Fouta. 
Thierno Abdourahmane is elected head of the section of the Agv in Labé, he composed, on the occasion of the Association's convention in city, the Hymn to Peace and Fouta Djallon , which was welcomed with an unprecedented success.
The poem describes a remarkable lyricism the suffering of the "war effort", duties that were tyrannically imposed on the population during the period 1940–1944.
In contrast to the miseries of war and oppression, men and territories of the Fouta-Djallon are magnified, to urge the love of country, explaining what this love is.
The poem ends in inviting the foutankes at work and to the study.
Thierno Abdourahmane displays the color of the favorite themes of his poetic inspiration: the love and compassion for the humble, the exhortation to the study and work, the love of the Homeland: Themes eminently democratic, socialists or at least philanthropists that it will resume more than once.

The evocation of his native Fouta
Another theme of Thierno Abdourahmane is the evocation of his Fouta-Djallon, its landscapes and its people , traditional events, and seasons . The last of these texts, which serves as a conclusion (lannirdhun) gives a good idea of the perception that has for the nature. 
The intellectual pleasure according to the poet, has a cost, a purpose: it is an invitation to the creative work of progress, work presents as a moral obligation, otherwise religious.

O brother, you see the beauty created for your country, and benefits and these indestructible wealth!
Watch over your country, love your countrymen, your children educated, secures your parents, suffer for them, you will not repent!
That Here I stop; this is enough to begin to understand the gift of God Almighty, tireless,
God, save us, save Guinea, increase the faith, the Union and our understanding, and blessings without end. 

Thierno Abdourahmane has enriched the written literature of the Fouta Djallon of remarkable pieces, despite the circumstantial nature of their creation. The fiction always born of reality; the literary works born of an event or a situation observed or experienced, creates from that, an imaginary situation perpetual, whose knowledge shapes the minds of the community. As a man of culture, Thierno Abdourahmane was a progressive. He was in his private life, as in his Islamic belief. He was progressive in his Fula literary creations.

Public life
Thierno has also led many public activities, and exercised administrative, political, and religious functions.

Political Activities
 1945: Elected head of the section of the Amicale Gilbert Vieillard (Agv) in Labé
 1956–1959: Deputy Mayor of Labé
 1963–1966: Commander of Arrondissement of Thiangel-Boori (Labé)
 1967–1969: Commander of Arrondissement of Timbi-Madiina (pita)
 1971–1973: Commander of Arrondissement of Kona (Koin)
 1974–1976: Commander of Arrondissement of Daara-Labé (Labé)
 1975–1983: Inspector of the madrasas (Ecole Franco-Arabe)
 1984–1987: Minister of Religious case of Guinea

Religious Activities
 1950: Elected Khalife general of the Brotherhood Tidjania for western Africa by Cherif Boun Oumar
 1950: Elected Treasurer of the Mosque of Karamoko Alfa Mo Labé.
 1976–1984: Member of the National Islamic Council Guinea, authority responsible of the pilgrimage to Mecca
 1981: Vice-President of the International Academy of Islamic law (Majmau-al-Fiqh)
 1973–1983: Imam of the Great Mosque Karamoko Alpha Mo Labé
 1984–1987:Imam Ratib of the Great Mosque of Faisal Conakry, Guinea
 1987–2010: Imam Ratib of the great mosque of Karamoko Alpha Mo Labé

Death

Thierno Abdourahmane spent the last years of his life in Labe, where it died 22 September 2013 at the age of 97; he is buried 23 September 2013 in the concession of his father, near the Grand Mosque Karamoko Alpha Mo Labe.

References

Guinean poets
Male poets
Guinean male writers
Guinean theologians
Guinean Muslims
20th-century Muslim theologians
Fula people
1916 births
2013 deaths
People from Labé Region
20th-century poets
20th-century male writers